Mehdi Belhadj (born 10 June 1995) is a French middle and long-distance runner, who specializes in the 3000 metres steeplechase. He competed in the 3000 m steeplechase at the 2022 World Athletics Championships, where he qualified for the final.

References

1995 births
Living people
French male long-distance runners
French male middle-distance runners
French male steeplechase runners
People from Villeneuve-la-Garenne
20th-century French people
21st-century French people